Regina Mukiibi (sometimes referred to as Regina Mukiibi Mugongo as well as Regina Naluyima Mukiibi) was a Ugandan businesswoman and entrepreneur notable for being the country's first ever funeral home director.

Background and education 
As she ventured into the funeral management business, Regina Mukiibi undertook professional training at the Salisbury College of Funeral Sciences and Embalming in London.

Business ventures 
After working as an accountant with the now defunct Uganda Commercial Bank, she operated a tour and travel company which she left in order to start the funeral management business. In 1996, Regina Mukiibi jointly registered Uganda Funeral Services , a funeral service management company with her since deceased brother, Freddie Katamba Mukiibi.

Awards 
 Uganda Investment Authority Woman Entrepreneur of Year - 2007
Investor of the Year National Award - 2009
Sustained Growth National Award - 2009

References 

21st-century Ugandan businesswomen
21st-century Ugandan businesspeople
Living people
Year of birth missing (living people)
20th-century Ugandan businesswomen
20th-century Ugandan businesspeople
Ganda people
Funeral directors